Dr. Horst Patuschka (22 May 1912 – 6 March 1943) was a Luftwaffe night fighter ace and recipient of the Knight's Cross of the Iron Cross during World War II.  The Knight's Cross of the Iron Cross was awarded to recognise extreme battlefield bravery or successful military leadership.  Horst Patuschka was killed on 6 March 1943 after his Junkers Ju 88 crashed near Bizerte, Tunisia due to engine failure.  During his career he was credited with 23 aerial victories all of them at night.  He was posthumously awarded the Knight's Cross on 10 May 1943.

Group commander and death
On 3 December 1942, Patuschka was appointed Gruppenkommandeur (group commander) of II. Gruppe of NJG 2, succeeding Hauptmann Herbert Bönsch who had been killed in action on 1 August.

Summary of career

Aerial victory claims
According to Obermaier, Patuschka was credited with 23 nocturnal aerial victories, claimed in an unknown number of combat missions. Foreman, Parry and Mathews, authors of Luftwaffe Night Fighter Claims 1939 – 1945, researched the German Federal Archives and found records for 23 nocturnal victory claims. Mathews and Foreman also published Luftwaffe Aces — Biographies and Victory Claims, also listing Patuschka with 23 claims.

Awards
 Flugzeugführerabzeichen
 Front Flying Clasp of the Luftwaffe in Gold
 Iron Cross (1939) 2nd and 1st Class
 Honour Goblet of the Luftwaffe on 21 September 1942 as Hauptmann and pilot
 German Cross in Gold on 29 October 1942 as Hauptmann in the 7./Nachtjagdgeschwader 2
 Knight's Cross of the Iron Cross on 10 May 1943 as Hauptmann and Gruppenkommandeur of II./Nachtjagdgeschwader 2

Notes

References

Citations

Bibliography

 
 
 
 
 
 
 
 
 
 
 

1912 births
1943 deaths
People from Saale-Holzland-Kreis
Luftwaffe pilots
German World War II flying aces
People from Saxe-Weimar-Eisenach
Luftwaffe personnel killed in World War II
Recipients of the Gold German Cross
Recipients of the Knight's Cross of the Iron Cross
Victims of aviation accidents or incidents in Tunisia
Military personnel from Thuringia